Margit Bakken (born 8 April 1967) is a Norwegian musician (vocals, guitar) and songwriter. She is one of the most established blues musicians in Norway, and often performs with Rita Engedalen as the duo Women in Blues. She has performed as a singer since the age of eight. In 1997, she was a contestant in the Norwegian version of the musical television show European Soundmix Show, where she was one of the finalists. 

Her debut album, On The Other Side, was released in 2009. In 2012, she released her second album, Women in Blues, with Rita Engedalen.

Discography 
On the Other Side (2009)
Women in Blues (2012), with Rita Engedalen

References

External links 
Margit Bakken in Setesdalswiki

Norwegian women singers
Norwegian singer-songwriters
Norwegian songwriters
Norwegian blues singers
Norwegian blues guitarists
English-language singers from Norway
Living people
Musicians from Notodden
1967 births